"Breakin'" is a song from The Music's second album, Welcome to the North. It was also the second single from that album, released in the UK and elsewhere in Europe as a single in early January 2005 and in Japan in early March 2005 as an EP. It peaked at the #20 position in the British charts and on Billboard's Alternative Songs chart.

Track listings

In the UK
Single released 10 January 2005 by Virgin Records
CD1 VSCDT1894
"Breakin'"
"Middle of Nowhere" (demo)
CD2 VSCDX1894
"Breakin'"
"Bleed From Within" (Live at Liverpool Academy)
"Bleed From Within" (Thin White Duke mix)
7" VS1894
"Breakin'"
"Freedom Fighters" (Jo Whiley "Live Lounge" Session version)

In Japan
EP released 9 March 2005 by Toshiba-EMI
CD VJCP-61102
"Breakin'"
"The People" (Nick McCabe remix)
"Welcome to the North" (live)
"The People" (live)
"Freedom Fighters" (live)
"Bleed From Within" (live)
"Breakin'" (video)

In Australia
EP released by EMI
CD 7243 8 70592 2 1
"Breakin"
"Middle of Nowhere" (Demo)
"Freedom Fighters" (John Digweed & Nick Muir Remix)
"Bleed From Within" (Live at Liverpool Academy)
"The People" (Nick McCabe Remix)

In other media
The song was featured in "Kanes and Abel's", an episode of the American television series Veronica Mars''.

Charts

References

External links
Article detailing the release of the single

The Music (band) songs
2005 singles
Song recordings produced by Brendan O'Brien (record producer)
Music videos directed by Phil Harder
2005 songs
Virgin Records singles